Battle is an electoral ward of the Borough of Reading, in the English county of Berkshire. It is situated to the west of the town centre, south of the River Thames, and is bordered by Kentwood, Caversham Heights, Thames, Abbey, Coley, Southcote and Norcot wards.

As with all wards, it elects three councillors to Reading Borough Council.  Elections since 2022 are held by thirds, with elections in three years out of four.

In the 2011, 2012, 2014, and 2022 elections a Labour Party candidate won each election.

These Councillors are currently Wendy Griffith, Gul Khan, and Sarah Hacker.

The area is ethnically diverse and has significant Afro-Caribbean and South Asian populations.

References

Wards of Reading